Giovanni Gastel (27 December 1955 – 13 March 2021) was an Italian photographer.

Biography 
Giovanni Gastel began to approach photography in the early 1970s.

In 1981, he started working for numerous fashion magazines, including Vogue, Elle, and Vanity Fair; he also collaborated with world-famous brands such as Dior, Trussardi, Krizia, Tod's, and Versace.

During these years of intense professional commitment, he began to develop his personal style, characterized by a poetic irony. His passion for art history led him to introduce a taste for balanced composition into photographs. His references are to Pop Art and Irving Penn's photographic work.

From 15 September 2020 to 05 March 2021, the MAXXI Museum in Rome presented the exhibition “Giovanni Gastel, The People I Like”.

Gastel died from COVID-19 in Milan on 13 March 2021, at the age of 65, during the COVID-19 pandemic in Italy.

References

1955 births
2021 deaths
Photographers from Milan
20th-century Italian photographers
20th-century male artists
21st-century Italian photographers
21st-century male artists
Deaths from the COVID-19 pandemic in Lombardy